Tel Kaif District (also Tel Keyf, Tel Kayf, Tel Kef or Tel Keppe,), Aramaic for "Hill of Stones", is a district in Nineveh Governorate, Iraq. It is majority Assyrian and Yazidi with a minority of Arabs.

Towns and villages include:
 Tel Keppe
 Alqosh
 Khatarah
 Tesqopa
 Batnaya
 Sharafiya
 Baqofah
 Bozan
 Beban
 Babirah
 Dughata
 Sreshka
 Khoshaba

See also
 Assyrian settlements
 Assyrian homeland
 Proposals for Assyrian autonomy in Iraq

Districts of Nineveh Governorate